Akira Kobayashi (小林 章, born 1960) is a Japanese font designer living in Germany. As type director for Monotype, he oversees typeface design and reprints of classic typefaces such as Optima. He has also served as a judge in several international typeface contests. He is a leading person in designing Western typefaces in Japan, and has co-developed fonts with Hermann Zapf and Adrian Frutiger. Kobayashi grew up in Japan and has written a Japanese-language book about Western fonts, titled "" ("Western font").

His work has been profiled in Communication Arts magazine, Print Magazine featured him in an interview, as did Sony Design.

References 

Living people

1960 births
People from Niigata (city)
Japanese typographers and type designers